This is a list of geographic UK dialling codes covering Wales that are currently in use. Some exchanges cover both sides of the Wales-England border. All geographic telephone numbers in Wales are in the format (01xxx) xxxxxx, with the exception of Cardiff and the surrounding area which is (029) xxxx xxxx.

(Source: "The Phone Book - Code Companion", BT)

Misconceptions

It is a common misconception that the code for Cardiff is 02920, whereas in fact it is 029 followed by an eight-digit local number. This is due to Cardiff previously having a 5 digit code (01222) with six-digit local numbers and that all of its local numbers began with 20 until 2005. This problem is also widespread in cities with other 02x codes such as Coventry, London, Portsmouth and Southampton, and in the region of Northern Ireland.

See also 

List of United Kingdom dialling codes
UK telephone numbering plan
Telephone numbers in the United Kingdom
Telecommunications in the United Kingdom
UK telephone code misconceptions

Telephone numbers in the United Kingdom
Telephone dialling codes